The 1951 SCCA National Sports Car Championship season was the first season of the Sports Car Club of America's National Sports Car Championship. It began May 12, 1951, and ended December 9, 1951, after eight races.  John Fitch won the season championship.

Schedule

 Feature race

Season results
Note: Although support races counted towards the season points championship, only feature race overall winners are listed below.

External links
World Sports Racing Prototypes: SCCA 1951
Racing Sports Cars: SCCA archive
Etceterini: 1951 program covers

SCCA National Sports Car Championship
SCCA National Sports Car